Maigret and the Coroner (other English-language title is Maigret at the Coroner's) is a detective novel by Belgian writer Georges Simenon, featuring his character inspector Jules Maigret. The novel was written between July 21 to July 30, 1949, in Tucson, Arizona, United States. The book was published in October, same year by Presses de la Cité.

Translations
The book has been translated into English by Frances Keene and published in 1980 as Maigret and the Coroner in London and as Maigret at the Coroner's in New York. The novel was translated by Linda Coverdale in 2016 and published under the title Maigret at the Coroner.

The first German translation by Jean Raimond was published by Kiepenheuer & Witsch in 1959. The new translation by Wolfram Schäfer was published by Diogenes Verlag in 1981.

Adaptation
The novel was adapted into an episode of the French television series "Les Enquêtes du Commissaire Maigret" (Maigret en Arizona) in 1981, with Jean Richard in the lead role.

Bibliography
Maurice Piron, Michel Lemoine, L'Univers de Simenon, guide des romans et nouvelles (1931-1972) de Georges Simenon, Presses de la Cité, 1983, p. 316-317

External links

Maigret at trussel.com

References

1949 Belgian novels
Maigret novels
Novels set in the United States
Novels set in the 20th century